Stephanie Pizzignacco (born 7 September 1986) is a Swedish gymnast.

She competed at the 2006 World Artistic Gymnastics Championships and 2016 CrossFit Games.

References

External links 
 2006 World Gymnastics Championships - Stephanie Pizzignacco

1986 births
Place of birth missing (living people)
Living people
Swedish female artistic gymnasts